The 2017 Matsumoto Yamaga FC season is Matsumoto Yamaga' 2nd consecutive season in the J2 League after losing at the promotion playoffs at the end of the 2016 season.

Squad
As of February 11, 2017.

Transfers

Trial

References

Matsumoto Yamaga FC
Matsumoto Yamaga FC seasons